USS Manta may refer to the following ships operated by the United States Navy:

 , was acquired and commissioned by the US Navy 8 December 1917 and decommissioned 13 March 1919 and returned to her owner
 , was launched 7 November 1943 and scrapped in September 1967

United States Navy ship names